Chapri can ref to:

 Chapri, Mianwali, village of Mianwali, Punjab, Pakistan
 Chapri, Nowshera, village of Nowshera, Khyber Pakhtunkhwa, Pakistan